The 1888 Minnesota gubernatorial election was held on November 6, 1888 to elect the governor of Minnesota.

Results

References

1888
Minnesota
gubernatorial
November 1888 events